{{DISPLAYTITLE:C8H6S}}
The molecular formula C8H6S (molar mass: 134.20 g/mol, exact mass: 134.0190 u) may refer to:

Benzo[c]thiophene
Benzothiophene

Molecular formulas